Al-Kum (officially known as al-Kum-al-Muwarraq-Beit Maqdum-Humsa) is a Palestinian village in the southern West Bank, part of the Hebron Governorate and located 13 kilometers west of Hebron. Its municipal borders stretch from the border with Israel in the west to boundaries of the city of Dura in the east. It had a population of 2,568 in the 2007 census by the Palestinian Central Bureau of Statistics.

History

Ottoman period 
Early Ottoman tax registers in the 16th century have Bayt Makhdum/Bayt Maqdum located in the  Nahiya of Halil of the Liwa of Quds. It was classified as Mazra'a (=cultivated) land.

In 1883, the PEF's Survey of Palestine found at Kh. el Kôm "traces of ruins and caves on a white hill-top." It further described it as "rather a large ruin."  
Khurbet el Murak  was described as "caves and two large foundations", while at  Beit Makdûm they noted "cisterns, caves, foundations, and walls, apparently an old site."

British Mandate era
At the time of the 1931 census of Palestine the populations of Kh. el Kum and Kh. Muraq were counted under Dura.

Jordanian era
After the 1948 Arab-Israeli War, the area was under Jordanian rule. The Jordanian census of 1961 found 247 inhabitants in Kaum and 150 in Muwarraq.

Post-1967
After the 1967 Six-Day War, the Al-Kum area (together with the rest of the West Bank) has been under Israeli occupation.

The modern Al-Kum village was formed as a result of a 1995 merger between the villages of al-Kum, al-Muwarraq, Beit Maqdum and Humsa, with al-Kum being the largest and in the middle of the latter three. Al-Kum and Beit Maqdum were founded sometime in the early 19th century during Ottoman rule in Palestine. Most of the residents of the four villages were migrants from nearby Dura or Palestinian refugees who fled there following the 1948 Arab-Israeli War. The principal families are Rajoub, al-Awawda and al-Sharha. Following the founding of the modern village, a six-member village council was established to administer its affairs and provide some municipal services.

The primary health care facilities for the village are at al-Kum designated by the Ministry of Health as level 1. Close by is Deir Sammit where the primary healthcare facilities are at level 2.

References

Bibliography

External links
 Welcome to Kh. Bayt Maqdum
Beit Maqdum, Welcome to Palestine
 Al-Kum, Welcome to Palestine
Mowaraq, Welcome to Palestine
Survey of Western Palestine, Map 21:    IAA, Wikimedia commons
Al Kum-Al Muwaraq-Beit Maqdum-Humsa village (fact sheet), Applied Research Institute–Jerusalem, ARIJ
 Al Kum, Al Muwarraq, Beit Maqdum, Humsa village profile, ARIJ
Al Kum aerial photo, ARIJ
The priorities and needs for development in Al Kum, Al Muwarraq, Humsa and Beit Maqdum villages based on the communities and local authorities’ assessment, ARIJ

Villages in the West Bank
Municipalities of the State of Palestine